Singapore competed at the 2011 World Aquatics Championships in Shanghai, China between July 16 and 31, 2011.

Swimming

Singapore qualified 5 swimmers.

Men

Women

Synchronised swimming

Singapore has qualified 10 athletes in synchronised swimming.

Women

References

2011 in Singaporean sport
Nations at the 2011 World Aquatics Championships
Singapore at the World Aquatics Championships